The serpopard is a mythical animal known from ancient Egyptian and Mesopotamian art. The word "serpopard" is a modern coinage. It is a portmanteau of "serpent" and "leopard", derived from the interpretation that the creature represents an animal with the body of a leopard and the long neck and head of a serpent. However, they have also been interpreted as "serpent-necked lions". There is no known name for the creature in any ancient texts.

Images
The image is featured specifically on decorated cosmetic palettes from the Predynastic period of Egypt, and more extensively, as design motifs on cylinder seals in the Protoliterate period of Mesopotamia (circa 3500–3000 BC). Examples include the Narmer Palette and the Small Palette of Nekhen (Hierakonopolis). The cylinder seal of Uruk (image above) displays the motif very clearly. Typically, two creatures are depicted, with their necks intertwined.

Interpretations

The image generally is classified as a feline, and with close inspection resembles an unusually long-necked lioness. It bears the characteristic tuft of the species at the end of the tail, there are no spots, the round-eared head most closely resembles the lioness rather than a serpent, because serpents do not have ears, and there are no typical serpent features such as scales, tongue, or reptilian head shape.

It has been suggested that in Ancient Egyptian art the serpopard represents "a symbol of the chaos that reigned beyond Egypt's borders", which the king must tame. They are normally shown conquered or restrained, as in the Narmer Palette, or attacking other animals. But in Mesopotamian art they are shown in pairs, with intertwined necks.

Mesopotamian use of these "serpent-necked lions" and other animals and animal hybrids is seen by some scholars as "manifestations of the chthonic aspect of the god of natural vitality, who is manifest in all life breaking forth from the earth".

Similarly to other ancient peoples, the Egyptians are known for their accurate depictions of the creatures they observed. Their composite creatures have recognizable features of the animals originally representing those deities,  merged into novel creatures.

Lionesses played an important role in the religious concepts of both Upper and Lower Egypt, and are likely to have been designated as animals associated with protection and royalty. The long necks could be a simple exaggeration, used as a framing feature in an artistic motif, either forming the cosmetic-mixing area, as in the Narmer Palette, or surrounding it, as in the Small Palette.

Depictions of fantastic animals also are known from Elam and Mesopotamia, as well as many other cultures.

In popular culture
 The Serpopards appear in The Kane Chronicles book The Red Pyramid. Two Serpopards were sent by Set to attack Philip of Macedonia, Sadie Kane, Carter Kane, and Khufu. They were defeated by Bast.

 A serpopard has appeared in the card game Magic: The Gathering in the Egyptian-themed world of Amonkhet. Its creature type is "cat snake" and it has outright serpentine traits not seen in ancient depictions.
 A serpopard attacks Malik and Karina in the necropolis beneath Ksar Alahari in A Song of Wraiths and Ruin by Roseanne A. Brown.

See also
Questing Beast
Qilin

References

O’Connor, David 2002. Context, function and program: understanding ceremonial slate palettes. Journal of the American Research Center in Egypt 39: 5–25.

External links
 good images of Narmer Palette by Francesco Rafaele

Egyptian legendary creatures
Ancient Egyptian palettes
Mythological hybrids
Legendary serpents